Ali Said (1927-1996) was an Indonesian judge, military officer and politician. Like his predecessor Mujono, he was one of a string of former military officials to be appointed to the judiciary of Indonesia.

Said often worked closely with Ismail Saleh and Mujono. Said replaced Mujono as Minister of Law and then as Chief Justice of the Supreme Court of Indonesia; Saleh replaced Said as Attorney General and then Minister of Law. Together, the three were known as the "Three Punokawan" or clown servants of the epic hero due to their perceived enthusiasm for upholding the law.

References

1927 births
1996 deaths
Chief justices of the Supreme Court of Indonesia
Attorneys General of Indonesia
People from Magelang